

Arthropods

Insects

Plesiosaurs

New taxa

Pterosaurs

New taxa

Synapsids

Non-mammalian

References

1860s in paleontology
Paleontology